Tillandsia pyramidata is a species of flowering plant in the family Bromeliaceae. It is native to Bolivia, Venezuela, Colombia, and Ecuador. Two varieties are recognized:

Tillandsia pyramidata var. pyramidata - Venezuela, Colombia, Ecuador, Peru
Tillandsia pyramidata var. vivipara Rauh - Ecuador and Junín Province of Peru

References

pyramidata
Flora of South America
Epiphytes
Plants described in 1889
Taxa named by Édouard André